Waldorf Hotel may refer to:

The Waldorf Hotel, the original section of the Waldorf–Astoria (1893–1929) in New York
Waldorf Astoria New York, its successor, on Fifth Avenue at 33rd Street
The original name of The Waldorf Hilton, London, England
Waldorf Hotel (Vancouver), British Columbia, Canada
Waldorf Hotel (Andover, South Dakota), United States
Waldorf Hotel (Fargo, North Dakota), United States

See also
 Waldorf–Astoria (disambiguation)
 Waldorf (disambiguation)